Anthare Santhe is a small town near Nagarhole National Park in Heggadadevankote, Mysore district, Karnataka, India.

Location
Anthare Santhe is the nucleus of a series of villages situated deep inside the Nagerhole forest of Karnataka state. Kabini river and reservoir lies on the eastern side of all these villages.

Balle Elephant Camp
Balle Elephant Camp is located near the Anthare Santhe village.  It is part of the Nagerhole national forest and it is located at the Balle checkpost.

Education
Honnamannakatte High School is the main educational organization in Anthara Santhe.

Suburbs and villages 
 D.B.Kuppe
 Machur
 Karapura
 Nisana Belathur
 Hemmankette
 Dommanakatete
 Lakshmi pura

See also
 
 Balle Elephant Camp
 D.B.Kuppe
 Daripura, Mysore
 Harohalli
 Jayapura, Mysore
 Mandanahalli

Image gallery

References

Villages in Mysore district